Jewcy is an online magazine of Jewish pop culture and offbeat news.  The site was launched on November 15, 2006. The Guardian has described Jewcy as "a cultural icon" and "at the forefront of a reinvention of Jewish identity by young US Jews". The New York Times has described Jewcy as part of "the Jewish Hipster movement".

In October 2009, the not-for-profit JDub Records announced that it had adopted Jewcy, making it a new project of the seven-year-old organization. Lilit Marcus served as editor-in-chief until February 2010, when Jason Diamond took over the position. In 2011, Tablet Magazine acquired Jewcy, and the former has been Jewcy's "big sister" site ever since.

Jewcy went on hiatus in 2018, and became active again in August 2021.

Notes

External links
 

Hipster (contemporary subculture)
Internet properties established in 2006
Jewish websites
Online magazines published in the United States
Magazines established in 2006
Jewish magazines published in the United States